Granny's Funeral is a 2012 French comedy film directed by Bruno Podalydès. The film was screened in the Directors' Fortnight section at the 2012 Cannes Film Festival.

Plot
After Granny's death, Armand, pharmacist in Chatou, France,  has to deal with his father who has Alzheimers, his wife, Helen, who doesn't want to divorce and his very demanding mistress, Alix.

Cast
 Denis Podalydès as Armand Lebrecq
 Valérie Lemercier as Alix
 Isabelle Candelier as Hélène Lebrecq
 Catherine Hiegel as Suzanne
 Michel Vuillermoz as Charles Rovier-Boubet
 Bruno Podalydès as Yvon Grinda
 Samir Guesmi as Haroun
 Pierre Arditi as Armand's father
 Michel Robin as Monsieur Salvini
 Judith Magre as Madame de Tandévou
 Vimala Pons as Young Berthe
 Noémie Lvovsky as The cryer

References

External links
 

2012 films
2012 comedy films
French comedy films
2010s French-language films
Films directed by Bruno Podalydès
2010s French films